The Israeli Druze Faction (al-Ketla al-Druzia al-Isra'iliah, HaSia'a HaDruzit HaYisraelit, also labelled as the 'Druze Party') was a short-lived, one-man political faction in Israel.

History
The party was established on 11 April 1967 during the sixth Knesset, when Jabr Muadi left Cooperation and Brotherhood.

Before the 1969 elections, Muadi joined Progress and Development, thus effectively swapping parties with Elias Nakhleh, who had begun the session as a member of Progress and Development, then left to set up the Jewish–Arab Brotherhood before joining Cooperation and Brotherhood.

See also
Politics of Israel

References

External links
Druze Party Knesset website

Arab political parties in Israel
Defunct political parties in Israel
Political parties established in 1967
1967 establishments in Israel
Political parties disestablished in 1969
1969 disestablishments in Israel
Druze community in Israel